Constantin Iavorschi is a Moldovan football player who currently is playing for FC Spicul Chișcăreni in Moldovan National Division.

References

External links

Constantin Iavorschi la divizianationala
Constantin Iavorschi la goal.com

1990 births
Living people
Moldovan footballers
Association football forwards
FC Lokomotiv Moscow players
FC Rostov players
FC Iskra-Stal players
FC Zimbru Chișinău players
FC Milsami Orhei players
FC Spicul Chișcăreni players
Moldovan Super Liga players